Topology and Its Applications is a peer-reviewed mathematics journal publishing research on topology. It was established in 1971 as General Topology and Its Applications, and renamed to its current title in 1980. The journal currently publishes 18 issues each year in one volume. It is indexed by Scopus, Mathematical Reviews, and Zentralblatt MATH. Its 2004–2008  MCQ was 0.38 and its 2020 impact factor was 0.617.

References

External links 
 

Mathematics journals
English-language journals
Elsevier academic journals
Publications established in 1971